Émile Albrecht (1897 – 11 February 1927) was a Swiss rower who competed in the 1924 Summer Olympics.

In 1924 he won the gold medal with the Swiss boat in the coxed four event. He was also part of the Swiss boat which won the bronze medal in the coxless four competition.

References

External links
 

1897 births
1927 deaths
Medalists at the 1924 Summer Olympics
Olympic bronze medalists for Switzerland
Olympic gold medalists for Switzerland
Olympic medalists in rowing
Olympic rowers of Switzerland
Rowers at the 1924 Summer Olympics
Swiss male rowers
European Rowing Championships medalists
Victims of aviation accidents or incidents in Switzerland
Victims of aviation accidents or incidents in 1927
20th-century Swiss people